The Teaser is a 1925 American silent romantic comedy drama film written by Lewis Milestone, Edward T. Lowe Jr., and Jack Wagner based upon the play of the same name by Adelaide Matthews and Martha M. Stanley. The film was directed by William A. Seiter for Universal Pictures, and stars Laura La Plante, Pat O'Malley, Hedda Hopper, and Walter McGrail.<ref>{{cite book
|last=American Film Institute
|author-link=American Film Institute
|title=The American Film Institute catalog of motion pictures produced in the United States, Part 1|editor=Kenneth White Munden|publisher=University of California Press|location=The Teaser' (Universal-Jewel)|year=1997
|pages=787–788|isbn=0-520-20969-9|url=https://books.google.com/books?id=rlLbRAPOgP0C&q=%22The+Teaser%22%2C+%22Laura+La+Plante%22&pg=PA787}}</ref>

Plot
Ann Barton (Laura La Plante), a girl from a once-wealthy family, must make a living by clerking in a cigar store. There she meets and falls in love with James McDonald (Pat O'Malley), a cigar salesman.  She is then adopted by Margaret Wyndham (Hedda Hopper), her rich and aristocratic aunt, who disapproves of James due to his crude manners. Wishing to break up the two, Aunt Margaret sends Ann away to finishing school.  In response, Ann acts out publicly and embarrasses her aunt. In the meantime, James learns how to be a proper gentleman and wins her back through having learned good manners and a more dignified bearing.

Cast

ReceptionThe New York Times felt there was no need to be overly enthusiastic about the films's plot or character portrayals: "it contains a silly, soulless lot of characters and a weird idea of drama."  When they expanded on Pat O'Malley's character of the cigar salesman, they granted that while it would be reasonable for a salesman to be willing to push his wares, they questioned the script having his character be so naive as to press the issue when he is at the home of his girlfriend's benefactors attempting to impress them and win her heart, by writing "one does not expect James MacDonald to be such an utter fool as to stick cigars under the noses of guests in a pretentious mansion at a time he hoped to wage war on the heart of the pretty Ann Barton." And in speaking toward Laura La Plante's character, who is scripted as being "a sly little minx, who believes in uttering untruths when they help her out of a difficulty, even if they do reflect on other persons,", they offered that "Miss La Plante is not particularly effective in this picture." They concluded "The story is a pathetic little thing which is not apt to interest many persons." Time Magazine'' offered that "The extraordinarily blonde Laura La Plante occupies herself genially enough in the title part."

Preservation
It is unknown whether any copies of this film exist, and it is considered a lost film.

References

External links

Still at silenthollywood.com

1925 films
1920s romantic comedy-drama films
American romantic comedy-drama films
American silent feature films
American black-and-white films
Films directed by William A. Seiter
Lost American films
Universal Pictures films
1925 lost films
Lost comedy-drama films
Lost romance films
1925 comedy films
1925 drama films
1920s American films
1920s English-language films
Silent romantic comedy films
Silent romantic drama films
Silent American comedy-drama films